Elaphoglossum hirtum is a species of fern in the Dryopteridaceae family. It is native to some islands in the Caribbean, the Azores and Madeira.

References 

Dryopteridaceae
Flora of the Caribbean
Flora of the Azores
Flora of Madeira
Plants described in 1905
Taxa named by Carl Frederik Albert Christensen